Waren (Müritz) station is a railway station in the municipality of Waren (Müritz), located in the Mecklenburgische Seenplatte district in Mecklenburg-Vorpommern, Germany.

References

Railway stations in Mecklenburg-Western Pomerania
Railway stations in Germany opened in 1879
1879 establishments in Prussia
Buildings and structures in Mecklenburgische Seenplatte (district)
Waren (Müritz)